Yuri Nikolayevich Bashkatov (20 June 1968 – 3 September 2022) was a Soviet (Moldovan) freestyle swimmer and graduate of the Technical University of Moldova.

In 1988, he won the national championships in the 100 m freestyle, setting a new Soviet record and qualifying for the Olympics. He competed at the 1988 and 1992 Summer Olympics, winning silver medals in the 4 × 100 m freestyle relay on both occasions; in 1988, he also finished fifth in the individual 100 m freestyle. Bashkatov won three medals, including one gold, at the 1989 European Aquatics Championships and 1991 World Aquatics Championships.

References

External links

1968 births
2022 deaths
Sportspeople from Chișinău
Soviet male freestyle swimmers
Moldovan male freestyle swimmers
Olympic swimmers of the Soviet Union
Olympic swimmers of the Unified Team
Olympic silver medalists for the Soviet Union
Swimmers at the 1988 Summer Olympics
Swimmers at the 1992 Summer Olympics
World Aquatics Championships medalists in swimming
European Aquatics Championships medalists in swimming
Medalists at the 1992 Summer Olympics
Medalists at the 1988 Summer Olympics
Olympic silver medalists in swimming
Dynamo sports society athletes